The 7th (Southland) Mounted Rifles was raised on 17 March 1911. During World War I they formed part of the Otago Mounted Rifles Regiment and served in the Battle of Gallipoli and was then withdrawn to Egypt. They would later serve in France, with the New Zealand Division.

Great War Battles 
Battle of Gallipoli
Battle of Flers - Courcelette. 15 – 22 Sep 1916.
Battle of Morval. 25 – 28 Sep 1916.
Battle of Le Transloy. 1 – 18 Oct 1916.
Battle of Messines. 7 – 14 Jun 1917.
Battle of Polygon Wood. 26 Sep – 3 Oct 1917.
Battle of Broodseinde. 4 Oct 1917.
Battle of Passchendaele. 12 Oct 1917.
Battle of Arras. 28 Mar 1918.
Battle of the Ancre. 5 Apr 1918.
Battle of Albert. 21 – 23 Aug 1918.
Battle of Bapaume. 31 Aug – 3 Sep 1918.
Battle of Havrincourt. 12 Sep 1918.
Battle of the Canal du Nord. 27 Sep – 1 Oct 1918.
Battle of Cambrai. 8 – 9 Oct 1918.
Pursuit to the Selle. 9 – 12 Oct 1918.
Battle of the Selle. 17 – 25 Oct 1918.
Battle of the Sambre. 4 Nov 1918, including the Capture of Le Quesnoy.

Major General Sir Alexander Godley was appointed honorary colonel of the Regiment in 1914.

Between the Wars 
They amalgamated with the 5th Mounted Rifles (Otago Hussars) and the 12th (Otago) Mounted Rifles to become the 5th New Zealand Mounted Rifles in 1921.

References 

Military units and formations established in 1911
Cavalry regiments of New Zealand
Military units and formations of New Zealand in World War I
New Zealand in World War I
History of Southland, New Zealand
1911 establishments in New Zealand
Military units and formations disestablished in 1921